The 2000 Challenge Cup (officially known as the 2000 Silk Cut Challenge Cup for sponsorship reasons) is a rugby league football tournament which began its preliminary stages in December 1999 and ended with the final on 29 April 2000.

The final was held on Saturday, 29 April 2000, at Murrayfield Stadium, Edinburgh, UK. The game was won by Bradford Bulls who defeated Leeds Rhinos 24-18.

First round

Second round

Third round

Fourth round

Fifth round

Quarter-finals

Semi-finals

Final
Referee: Steve Presley (Castleford)

Attendance: 67,247

Final Score: Bradford Bulls 24 - 18 Leeds Rhinos

Bradford Bulls team
Stuart Spruce, Nathan McAvoy, Scott Naylor, Michael Withers, Tevita Vaikona, Henry Paul, Robbie Paul, Brian McDermott, James Lowes, Paul Anderson, Jamie Peacock, Mike Forshaw, Brad Mackay

Subs: Leon Pryce, David Boyle, Bernard Dwyer, Stuart Fielden  Coach: Matthew Elliott

Scorers
Tries: Michael Withers (2), Nathan McAvoy, Stuart Fielden

Goals: Henry Paul (4)

Leeds Rhinos team
Iestyn Harris, Leroy Rivett, Richie Blackmore, Keith Senior, Francis Cummins, Daryl Powell, Ryan Sheridan, Darren Fleary, Dean Lawford, Barrie McDermott, Adrian Morley, Anthony Farrell, Andy Hay

Subs: Marcus St Hilaire, Lee Jackson, David Barnhill, Jamie Mathiou Coach: Dean Lance

Scorers
Tries: Andy Hay, Marcus St Hilaire

Goals: Iestyn Harris (5)

Man of the match
The Lance Todd Trophy was awarded to Henry Paul (Bradford).

References

External links
 2000 Challenge Cup Final

Challenge Cup
Challenge Cup
Bradford Bulls